The Bókmenntaverðlaun Tómasar Guðmundssonar (Tómas Guðmundsson literature award) is an award which the city of Reykjavík awards in memory of the poet Tómas Guðmundsson. The award was first made in 1994, and thereafter every other year up to 2005, whereupon the award was made annually. The award is given to an unpublished poetry collection, which is then published.

Award winners 
 1994 - Helgi Ingólfsson, Letrað í vindinn
 1997 - Ebba Gunnarsdóttir, Sumar sögur
 1998 - Bjarni Bjarnason, Borgin bak við orðin
 2000 - Hjörtur Björgvin Marteinsson, AM 00
 2002 - Sigurbjörg Þrastardóttir, Sólar Saga
 2004 - Auður Ava Ólafsdóttir, Rigning í nóvember
 2006 - Ingunn Snædal, Guðlausir menn - Hugleiðingar um jökulvatn og ást
 2007 - Ari Jóhannesson, Öskudagar
 2008 - Magnús Sigurðsson, Fiðrildi, mynta og spörfuglar Lesbíu
 2009 - Eyþór Árnason, Hundgá úr annarri sveit
 2010 - Þórdís Gísladóttir, Leyndarmál annarra.
 2011 - Sindri Freysson Í klóm dalalæðunnar
 2012 - Dagur Hjartarson, Þar sem vindarnir hvílast - og fleiri einlæg ljóð
 2013 - Bjarki Karlsson, Árleysi alda
 2014 - Hjörtur Marteinsson, Alzheimer-tilbrigðin
 2015 - Ragnar Helgi Ólafsson, Til hughreystingar þeim sem finna sig ekki í samtíma sínum
 2016 - Eyrún Ósk Jónsdóttir, Góðfúslegt leyfi til sígarettukaupa
 2017 - Jónas Reynir Gunnarsson, Stór olíuskip
 2018 - Haukur Ingvarssonar, Vistarverur
 2019 - Harpa Rún Kristjánsdóttir, Edda
 2020 - Ragnheiður Lárusdóttir, 1900 og eitthvað

Sources 
 

Icelandic literary awards
Awards established in 1994
1994 establishments in Iceland